El Wak, also Elwak is a town in Kenya, on the International border with Somalia.

Location
The coordinates of the town are: 2°48'10.0"N, 40°55'39.0"E (Latitude:2.802771; Longitude:40.927510).

Overview
The town, which lies approximately halfway between Wajir and Mandera, is the southern end of the proposed Elwak–Mandera Road. Directly across the border from El Wak is the neighborhood in Somalia called Bur Ache, in the greater El Wak, Somalia area. The town has a new airstrip Elwak Airport, opened in February 2016.

See also
List of roads in Kenya

References

External links
Website of Kenya National Highways Authority
 The Road to El Wak, Mandera

Populated places in Mandera County
Kenya–Somalia border crossings
Divided cities